The European Association of Mining Industries, Metal Ores & Industrial Minerals (Euromines) was founded in 1996 to represent several national mining associations mainly from Western Europe. Today the association is the recognized representative of the European metals and minerals mining industry and represents 19 national European federations and 28 companies as direct members from the whole Europe. Altogether large and small member companies and their subsidiaries in Europe and in other parts of the world provide jobs to more than 350,000 people. Through the activities and operations of these members, more than 42 different metals and minerals are produced. For some metals and minerals, Europe is the world's leading producer.

The association facilitates the dialogue between the industry and the EU institutions and serves as a network for cooperation and for the exchange of information throughout the sector within Europe. It also provides a formal platform in which the members evaluate the impact of European and International policies and legislation on the industry and define common positions and actions. The association also fosters contacts with the mining community throughout the world.

The association is based in Brussels and holds membership meetings twice a year. Its working committees and groups meet regularly throughout the year. Its major activities cover the areas of environment, health and safety, resource efficiency, energy and climate change, research and development, and international cooperation.

Guidelines for Sustainable Development in the European Mining Sector
(first published in June 1999)

The extractive industry contributes to sustainable development by integrating economic growth with environmental protection, social progress and effective governance.

Euromines' members have set forth and adhere to a series of guidelines for sustainable development in the European mining sector. These guidelines are based on the precept that access to and use of minerals and metals are essential to a sustainable society, to society’s well-being and to economic development. 

The Guidelines for Sustainable Development state:

 - Members of the European mining industry shall conduct their activities according to principles which promote sustainable development.
 - The European mining industry shall promote society’s recognition that access to and use of mineral resources is integral to sustainable development for present and future generations.
 - Members shall implement risk management strategies based on valid data and sound science.

The economic aspect
 - Members shall conduct their activities to ensure their long-term viability.
 - Members must remain viable if they are to develop and meet the demands and expectations of modern society for minerals and metals.
 - Members shall conduct their affairs in a properly accountable manner with respect to all financial matters, and the environmental and social aspects of their operations.

The environmental aspect
 - Industrial minerals and metal ores can only be extracted from their naturally occurring geological locations.
 - Mining activities invariably have some effect on the environment and the minimization of any such effect shall be integral to the conduct of mining activities.
 - Members shall seek continual improvement of environmental performance on the basis of sound science and technical and economic feasibility.
 - Environmental protection will be considered throughout the life of a mine from exploration to mine closure.
 - Environmental protection must be reached by developing, establishing and implementing good environmental practices.
 - Members shall facilitate and encourage the promotion of safe use, recycling and disposal of products through an understanding of their life cycles.
   Environmental protection promotes the conservation of biodiversity and integrated approaches to land use planning.

The social aspect
 - Members shall seek continual improvement of good, safe and positive working conditions taking all protection measures necessary.
 - Members shall identify and minimize potential risks associated with mining and shall adopt suitable preventative measures to reduce such risks.
 - Members shall respect human rights, cultures, customs and values of people affected by their activities.
 - Members shall adhere to ethical business practices in all operations and sound systems of governance.
 - Members shall be constructive partners to advance the social, economic and institutional development of the communities in which they operate.
 - Members shall implement an effective and transparent dialogue, communication and verified reporting arrangements with their stakeholders.

European Mining Sector : focused on Raw Materials Initiative

At the end of 2008 the European Commission published its Communication. Realizing it needed to address this very important issue at the highest level in order ensure security of raw material supply for its economic growth, Europe proposed a whole host of measures to improve its raw materials supply.

Euromines welcomed this initiative wholeheartedly since in the past years a whole array of legislative measures and the lack of public awareness in Europe had made access to raw materials for the extractive industry as well as for the downstream industry more and more difficult and, at the best of times, time consuming.

The availability and affordability of minerals are therefore important considerations for the competitiveness of much of European industry. The effect of the recent rapid increase in global demand for metals and metal ores, for example, clearly demonstrates the impact of constraining supplies of raw materials - price increases and bottlenecks in supplies – leading in some cases to production shutting down in Europe. This trend is expected to continue in the medium to long term as developing countries seek to improve the living standards of their populations.

Euromines members
 Euromines National Federations
 Euromines Member Companies
 Euromines Associate Federations
 Euromines Associate Companies

Euromines latest Publications
 Natura 2000: A Guide to the Guide
 Book 101 Things to do with a hole in the ground – co-operation with Post-Mining Alliance
 Position on Resource Efficiency
 Annual Report 2010

References

External links 
 Euromines official Website
 European Commission – DG enterprise and Industry
 ICMM

Mining organizations